Estafeta Carga Aérea S.A. de C.V. is a cargo airline based in Mexico City, Mexico. It operates domestic cargo charters in Mexico and the United States and has over 25 interline agreements providing connecting services to the rest of the Americas, Europe and Asia. Its main base is Ponciano Arriaga International Airport, San Luis Potosí.

History
The airline was established on 9 February 2000 and started operations on 2 November 2000. It began with domestic cargo services and added international services in January 2002. It is wholly owned by the Estafeta Group and has 174 employees (at March 2007).

Destinations 
The airline offers service to 12 Mexican cities and 1 in the United States:

Fleet

Current fleet
The Estafeta Carga Aérea fleet consists of the following aircraft (as of November 2022):

Historic Fleet 
The airline had the following historic fleet:

References

External links

Estafeta Carga Aérea 

Airlines of Mexico
Cargo airlines of Mexico
Airlines established in 2000
Airlines of Mexico City
Mexican companies established in 2000